Vosta Kola or Vosta Kala may refer to:
 Vosta Kola, Amol
 Vosta Kola, Qaem Shahr